Churtakh is a rural locality (a selo) in Kulushatsky Selsoviet, Laksky District, Republic of Dagestan, Russia. The population was 167 as of 2010. There are 9 streets.

Geography 
Churtakh is located 9 km south of Kumukh (the district's administrative centre) by road, on the Kazikumukhskoye Koysu River. Khurkhi and Shara are the nearest rural localities.

Nationalities 
Laks live there.

References 

Rural localities in Laksky District